Adnan Yousoof (born 5 July 1958), also known as Adnan Youssef, is a sailor from Pakistan, who represented his country at the 1984 Summer Olympics in Los Angeles, United States as crew member in the Soling. With helmsman Khalid Akhtar and fellow crew member Naseem Khan they took the 20th place.

References

External links
 

1968 births
Living people
Pakistani male sailors (sport)
Olympic sailors of Pakistan
Sailors at the 1984 Summer Olympics – Soling
20th-century Pakistani people